Roaring Rapids is a river rapids ride located at Six Flags Magic Mountain in Valencia, California, Six Flags Over Texas in Arlington, Texas and Six Flags Great America in Gurnee, Illinois.

History 
Six Flags Astroworld and Intamin partnered in 1979 to build the world's first river rapids ride in 1980 called Thunder River. The water ride became so popular at Astroworld that Six Flags debuted two new river rapids in 1981 at Six Flags Magic Mountain and at Six Flags Great Adventure, 1983 at Six Flags Over Texas, and 1984 at Six Flags Great America. The version at Six Flags Over Texas features a dual loading station where boats can be loaded at twice the rate of one loading station. The Magic Mountain version doesn't feature a dual loading station but is built to feature one. The Great America version also doesn't feature a dual loading station but features a turning station where the station moves in a circle with the boat where riders can depart and get on. The Six Flags Over Texas and Six Flags Magic Mountain rides operate from spring to the end of Fright Fest in October. The Six Flags Great America ride operates from spring to around Labor Day. At some parks, the ride is transformed into a Fright Fest maze during October. At Six Flags Over Texas the ride is closed during both Fright Fest and Holiday in the park.  

The Six Flags Great America version closed for the entire season in 2021 due to a $1,000,000 refurbishment on the ride, and closed for half of the season in 2022, but later re-opened on July 30, 2022. 

The ride made an appearance in a Kidsongs episode, Ride the Roller Coaster.

Ride 
Once the twelve riders strap themselves into one of the boats, the boat then leaves the station to the artificial river that is shaped like an oval at Over Texas and Magic Mountain. The twelve riders at Great America's version goes through a unique course rather than in an oval. During all three rides, there are different objects that are in the water that disrupt the flow of the river that creates the rapids. Six Flags Over Texas and Six Flags Great America's versions feature waterfalls towards the end as another way to get passengers completely soaked. Once riders go through the full course of the ride, the boat will then reach the lift and be taken back into the station.

Incidents 

On March 21, 1999, a 28-year-old woman died at Six Flags Over Texas, and 10 other guests were injured, when the raft they were on overturned in 2–3 feet of water due to sudden deflation of the air chambers that support the raft. The raft then got caught on an underwater pipe, which provided leverage for the rushing water in the ride to flip the raft over.  In a subsequent settlement, Six Flags agreed to pay US$4 million to the victim's family, and the company would join the family in a lawsuit against Canyon Manufacturing Co., the company responsible for parts that were related to the accident.

See also
 Congo Rapids, formerly known as Roaring Rapids at Six Flags Great Adventure
 Thunder River at Six Flags Over Georgia and Six Flags St. Louis

References

Primary sources

The Coaster Guy, Roaring Rapids full of information and facts of Roaring Rapids

Amusement rides introduced in 1981
Amusement rides introduced in 1983
Amusement rides introduced in 1984
Six Flags Magic Mountain
Six Flags Over Texas
Six Flags Great America
Water rides
Water rides manufactured by Intamin
Six Flags attractions